Joe Rodriguez Baldonado  (August 28, 1930 – November 25, 1950) was a United States Army recipient of the Medal of Honor for his actions during the Battle of the Ch'ongch'on River in the Korean War.

Biography
Baldonado, the son of Mexican migrant workers, was born in Colorado on Aug. 28, 1930, joining the U.S. Army as a light weapons infantryman (parachutist) during the Korean War. In that conflict, Baldonado was killed in an action for which he was to posthumously receive the Medal of Honor. The family of Baldonado included his parents Rebecca and Ramon brothers Richard, Manuel, Charles, Ramon jr., Gilbert and his sisters Virginia, Andy, Josephine, and  Hortencia.

Baldonado's acts of bravery were briefly described in a 1989 book, "Disaster in Korea: The Chinese Confront MacArthur."

Medal of Honor
Baldonado distinguished himself on November 25, 1950, while serving as a machine-gunner in the vicinity of Kangdong, Korea. Baldonado's platoon was occupying Hill 171 when the enemy attacked, attempting to take their position. Baldonado held an exposed position, cutting down wave after wave of enemy troops even as they targeted attacks on his position. During the final assault by the enemy, a grenade landed near Baldonado's gun, killing him instantly.

Baldonado was initially awarded the Distinguished Service Cross, the U.S. Army's second-highest award, his award was upgraded to a Medal of Honor. The award came through the Defense Authorization Act which called for a review of Jewish American and Hispanic American veterans from World War II, the Korean War and the Vietnam War to ensure that no prejudice was shown to those deserving the Medal of Honor.

Citation
'''

Commendations
Baldonado also received the following:

References

See also
List of Korean War Medal of Honor recipients

1930 births
1950 deaths
American military personnel killed in the Korean War
American people of Mexican descent
Military personnel from Colorado
United States Army Medal of Honor recipients
United States Army non-commissioned officers
Korean War recipients of the Medal of Honor
Burials at Arlington National Cemetery
Deaths by hand grenade
United States Army personnel of the Korean War